Vishal Singh (born 7 September 1985) is an Indian model and television actor known for his roles of Ayaan Nanda in Kuchh Is Tara and Jigar Chirag Modi in Saath Nibhaana Saathiya.

Life and career
Singh was born in the city of Bathinda in Punjab on 7 September 1985. He also plays Polo and was awarded Maharaj Sawai Man Singh Award in 2001. Singh got his first break though Ekta Kapoor's production company.

Filmography

Films

Television

References

External links
 
 

1985 births
Living people
Indian male models
Indian male television actors
Indian male soap opera actors
Male actors in Hindi television
People from Bathinda
21st-century Indian male actors